The Party of National Unity was a party created on 21 November 1938 in the Czech part of Czechoslovakia after the occupation of large parts of the country by Germany (Munich Agreement) and Hungary (First Vienna Award) as a last attempt to unify forces to save Czechoslovakia from disappearing. Its Slovak equivalent in the Slovak part of Czechoslovakia was the Hlinka's Slovak Peoples Party - Party of Slovak National Unity created on 8 November.

It included most of all previous Czech political parties - absolute majority of the Republican Party of Farmers and Peasants, National Unification, Czechoslovak Traders' Party, National Fascist Community, minor parties like National League, Czechoslovak Christian Social Party, National People's Party and part of Czechoslovak People's Party and Czechoslovak National Social Party.

Ideologically the party was corporatist and quasi-fascist. The party's chairman was the prime minister Rudolf Beran.

The party was forcibly dissolved after the creation of the Protectorate of Bohemia and Moravia in March 1939. A part of the membership created the Národní souručenství (in English approx. National Partnership), the only Czech political organization permitted by the Germans in the Protectorate.

References

See also 
 History of Czechoslovakia
 Slovak People's Party

1938 establishments in Czechoslovakia
1939 disestablishments in Czechoslovakia
Czech National Social Party
Political parties established in 1938
Political parties disestablished in 1939
Political parties in Czechoslovakia